
Hans Hüttner (19 November 1885 – 11 September 1956) was a general in the Wehrmacht of Nazi Germany during World War II who held commands at the division and corps levels. He was a recipient of the Knight's Cross of the Iron Cross. 

At the end of the war, he commanded the 703rd Infantry Division.

Awards and decorations

 Knight's Cross of the Iron Cross on 4 September 1942 as Oberst and commander of Infanterie-Regiment 520

References

Citations

Bibliography

 

1885 births
1956 deaths
People from Hof (district)
People from the Kingdom of Bavaria
Major generals of the German Army (Wehrmacht)
Recipients of the clasp to the Iron Cross, 1st class
Recipients of the Gold German Cross
Recipients of the Knight's Cross of the Iron Cross
Recipients of the Medal for Bravery (Austria-Hungary)
German prisoners of war in World War I
World War I prisoners of war held by the United Kingdom
Military personnel from Bavaria
20th-century Freikorps personnel